The 2008 East Asian Judo Championships was contested in seven weight classes, seven each for men and women.

This competition was held at Gym of Taiwan Police College in Taipei, Taiwan, 20 and 21 September.

Medal overview

Men

Women

Medals table

See also
 List of sporting events in Taiwan

External links
Judo Union of Asia

East Asian Judo Championships
Asian Championships, East
Judo Asian Championships, East
Judo Asian Championships, East
2008 Judo Asian Championships, East
Judo 2008 Asian Championships, East
Asian Championships, East